Sultan Hossain Khan was a Bangladeshi Judge and the Chief Election Commissioner of Bangladesh. He was the chairperson of the Anti-Corruption Commission and Bangladesh Press Council.

Career 
From 17 February 1990 to 24 December 1990, Khan served as the Chief Election Commissioner of Bangladesh. He oversaw the first democratic election in Bangladesh after military dictator Hussain Mohammad Ershad was overthrown by a popular revolt in 1990. He led the investigation of the Logang massacre in 1992 in the Chittagong Hill Tracts.

Khan was appointed the first chairperson of the newly formed Anti-Corruption Commission in 2004. His appointment was challenged by Bangladesh Supreme Court lawyer Aminul Haque Helal in court. On 8 February 2007, Khan resigned following a request to do so by the President of Bangladesh, Iajuddin Ahmed.

Khan has served as the Chairperson of Bangladesh Press Council.

Death 
Khan died on 5 July in 2015 at Square Hospital, Dhaka, Bangladesh.

References 

2015 deaths
Bangladeshi judges
Chief Election Commissioners of Bangladesh